The year 1973 in science and technology involved some significant events, listed below.

Astronomy and space exploration
 March 7 – Comet Kohoutek is discovered
 April 6 – Launch of Pioneer 11 spacecraft
 May 14 – Skylab, the United States' first space station, is launched.
 Solar eclipse of June 30, 1973 – Very long total solar eclipse visible in NE South America, the Atlantic, and central Africa. During the entire Second Millennium, only seven total solar eclipses exceed seven minutes of totality; this is the last. Observers aboard a Concorde jet are able to stretch totality to about 74 minutes by flying along the path of the moon's umbra.
 July 25 – Soviet Mars 5 space probe launched.
 November 3 – Mariner program: NASA launches the Mariner 10 toward Mercury (on March 29, 1974, it becomes the first space probe to reach that planet); it will be the first space flight to use gravity assist.
 December 3 – Pioneer program: Pioneer 10 sends back the first close-up images of Jupiter.
 December 7 – The "Big Ear" at the Ohio State University Radio Observatory begins a full-time search for extraterrestrial intelligence (SETI) radio survey, running continuously until 1995.

Biology
 December 28 – Endangered Species Act signed into law in the United States.

Cartography
 Waldo R. Tobler introduces the Tobler hyperelliptical projection.

Chemistry
 A successful method of Vitamin B12 total synthesis is reported by the groups of Robert Burns Woodward and Albert Eschenmoser.

Computer science
 March 1 - Xerox PARC releases the Xerox Alto. The first computer designed to support an operating system based on a graphical user interface. 
 September - The TV Typewriter appears on the cover of Radio-Electronics. Designed by Don Lancaster, it was a video terminal that could display two pages of 16 lines of 32 upper case characters on a standard television set.
 October – A form of the suffix automaton is introduced by Peter Weiner.
 November 21 – The sci-fi movie Westworld is the first feature film to use digital image processing.

Cryptography
 October – Asymmetric key algorithms for public-key cryptography developed by James H. Ellis, Clifford Cocks and Malcolm J. Williamson at the United Kingdom Government Communications Headquarters.

Earth sciences
 Derek Ager publishes The Nature of the Stratigraphical Record.

History of science
 May 5–July 28 – BBC Television series The Ascent of Man, written and presented by Jacob Bronowski, first airs; there is also an accompanying bestselling book.

Mathematics
 Fischer Black and Myron Scholes first articulate the Black–Scholes mathematical model of a financial market containing certain derivative investment instruments.
 Jürgen Stückrad and Wolfgang Vogel introduce the Buchsbaum ring.

Physiology and medicine
 August – Production of monoclonal antibodies involving human–mouse hybrid cells is first described by Jerrold Schwaber.
 The term "dendritic cell" is coined by Ralph M. Steinman working with Zanvil A. Cohn.
 The term "Norrmalmstorgssyndromet", translated as Stockholm syndrome, is coined by Nils Bejerot.

Psychiatry
 David Rosenhan publishes the results of his experiment into the validity of psychiatric diagnosis.
 The American Psychiatric Association publishes the 1st edition of its Principles of Medical Ethics, incorporating the 'Goldwater rule' (that it is unethical for a psychiatrist to offer a professional opinion on an individual in the public eye without an examination and consent).
 December 15 – The American Psychiatric Association removes the definition of homosexuality as a mental disorder from the 2nd edition of its Diagnostic and Statistical Manual of Mental Disorders (DSM-II).

Technology
 April 2 – The LexisNexis computerized legal research service begins.
 April 3 – The first handheld mobile phone call is made by Martin Cooper of Motorola in New York City.
 June 4 – A United States patent for the Docutel automated teller machine is granted to Donald Wetzel, Tom Barnes and George Chastain.
 Ichiro Kato, Waseda University, develops the world's first full-scale humanoid robot, Wabot-1.

Institutions
 March 6 – The Montenegrin Academy of Sciences and Arts, founded as the Montenegrin Society for Science and Arts (Crnogorsko društvo za nauku i umjetnost), elects its first members.

Awards
 Nobel Prizes
 Physics – Leo Esaki, Ivar Giaever, Brian David Josephson
 Chemistry – Ernst Otto Fischer, Geoffrey Wilkinson
 Medicine – Karl Von Frisch, Konrad Lorenz, Nikolaas Tinbergen
 Turing Award – Charles W. Bachman

Births
 May 19 – Alice Roberts, English evolutionary biologist, biological anthropologist and science and archaeology popularizer
 October 5 – Cédric Villani, French mathematician
 November 19 – Nim Chimpsky (d. 2000), chimpanzee
 December 5 – Luboš Motl, Czech theoretical physicist

Deaths
 February 11 – J. Hans D. Jensen (b. 1907), German nuclear physicist
 March 12 – David Lack (b. 1910), English ornithologist
 March 14 – Howard H. Aiken (b. 1900), American computing pioneer
 March 28 – C. Doris Hellman (b. 1910), American historian of science
 March 30 – William Justin Kroll (b. 1889), Luxembourgish metallurgist
 May 21 – Grigore Moisil (b. 1906), Romanian mathematician, died in Canada
 July 1 – Laurens Hammond (b. 1895), American inventor
 August 9 – Preben von Magnus (b. 1912), Danish virologist
 August 12 – Walter Rudolf Hess (b. 1881), Swiss physiologist, recipient of the Nobel Prize in Physiology or Medicine
 August 16 – Selman Waksman (b. 1888), Ukrainian-born Jewish-American biochemist and microbiologist
 November 25 – Elisa Leonida Zamfirescu (b. 1887), Romanian engineer
 December 10 – Wolf V. Vishniac (b. 1922), American microbiologist
 December 17 – Charles Greeley Abbot (b. 1872), American astrophysicist

References

 
20th century in science
1970s in science